Calry-St Joseph's is a Gaelic Athletic Association club based in Calry and the northern ward of Sligo, Éire. The club was formerly known as Calry Gaels until it became Calry-St Joseph's in 1987 after a re-organisation of the GAA structures in the Sligo urban area. They have won the last 7 Sligo Senior Hurling Championships and played in 12 of the last 13 finals, winning in 2005 until 2009 and again from 2011 to 2017 (minus 2010). In 2009 they won the Connacht Junior Club Hurling Championship beating Galway side Skehana 1-09 to 0-10 in the final having lost to them the year before and they repeated that feat again in 2012 by beating the same opposition from before, Skehana. They followed up that victory with a double double by winning both Provincial and County Championships in 2013. The club's most recent victory in the Connacht Junior Hurling Championship came in 2016. Reduced to 13 men, with two players sent off, they clawed back a deficit of 5 points to tie the match and go on to beat Micheál Breathnach of the Galway Gaeltacht in extra-time, 3-9 to 2-10.
They won the Sligo Intermediate Football Championship in 2004 & 2014 and came Runners Up in 1988, 1990 & 2013 and won Sligo Junior Football Championship in 1976 & 1987 and were Runners Up in 1983 & 1984.

Notable players
Aidan Devaney

Honours
 Connacht Junior Club Hurling Championship: (4)
 2009, 2012, 2013, 2016
 Sligo Senior Hurling Championship: (11)
 2005, 2007, 2008, 2009, 2011, 2012, 2013, 2014, 2015, 2016 2017
 Sligo Intermediate Football Championship: (2)
 2004, 2014
 Sligo Junior Football Championship: (2)
 1976, 1987
 Sligo Junior B Football Championship: (1)
 2010
 Sligo Under 20 Football Championship: (1)
 2010
 Sligo Under-14 Football Championship: (2)
 1998, 1999
 Sligo Intermediate Football League Division 3 (ex Div. 2): (1)
 2005
 Sligo Junior Football League (Division 5): (4)
 1975, 1976, 1983, 2009
 Benson Cup: (3)
 2005, 2014, 2018
 Sligo Under-16 C Football Championship: (1)
 2014

References

External links
Official Website

Hurling clubs in County Sligo
Gaelic football clubs in County Sligo
Gaelic games clubs in County Sligo
Sport in Sligo (town)